The Australian masked owl (Tyto novaehollandiae) is a barn owl of Southern New Guinea and the non-desert areas of Australia.

Taxonomy
Described subspecies of Tyto novaehollandiae include:
 T. n. calabyi I.J. Mason, 1983, (southern New Guinea)
 T. n. castanops (Gould, 1837), Tasmanian masked owl (Tasmania and introduced to Lord Howe Island)
 T. n. galei Mathews, 1914, (Cape York Peninsula)
 T. n. kimberli (Mathews, 1912), Northern masked owl (northern mainland Australia)
 T. n. melvillensis Mathews, 1912, (Tiwi Islands)
 T. n. novaehollandiae (Stephens, 1826), (southern mainland Australia)
 T. n. troughtoni N.W. Cayley, 1931,  cave-nesting masked owl (Nullarbor Plain, validity doubtful)

Description

Brown feathers surround a white, heart-shaped mask. Their dorsal plumage is brown, aside from light gray spots on the upper back. Their front is white with brown spots. Their eye color varies from black to dark brown. The species have sexual dimorphism, females are darker shaded and larger than males.

Masked owls follow the typical pattern of birds from the tropics being much smaller than birds from temperate regions. In this instance, Tasmanian masked owls are the largest and the largest of the entire barn-owl family. Among the species in the family, only the greater sooty owl is on average heavier than the Australian masked owl but the Tasmanian species is rather larger and heavier even than the greater sooty owl.

Naming
Other common names have been used for this species in the past.  For example:
 Mouse-Owl – This was a name given to the species by Latham in 1821. It is thought to be due to its habit of catching mice at homesteads.

Habitat

The Australian masked owl inhabits timbered areas, often with a shrub understorey.  In Australia they are seldom found more than 300 km inland. They roost and nest in large tree hollows near foraging areas. They are nocturnal and their prey includes rodents, small dasyurids, possums, bandicoots, rabbits, bats, birds, reptiles and insects. Foraging is primarily for terrestrial prey, however some prey is taken from the trees or in flight. The population of the Australian masked owl on the mainland is declining and several states have this owl on the Species Conservation Status list. They are territorial and may remain in the same area once they have established a breeding territory. A 2020 case study done using radio telemetry showed that the “home” range of these owls might be as large as 19-23 km2, but this data remains ambiguous due to the small sample size.

Reproduction
They breed when conditions are favorable which can be any time of the year. The nest is usually built in hollow trees with soil, mulch or sand. Some populations  are known to use caves or rock crevices for nesting and roosting.  The female lays two or three eggs and incubates them while the male hunts for food. The young are white or off white when they first develop feathers. They can leave the nest at two to three months of age but return to be fed by the parents for another month before going on their own.

Conservation status
The population of the Australian masked owl on the mainland is declining and several states have placed this owl on the Species Conservation Status list.

In Victoria (Australia), the masked owl is a listed threatened bird, and an Action Statement has been prepared under the Flora and Fauna Guarantee Act 1988. In New South Wales, the masked owl is scheduled as Vulnerable under the Biodiversity Conservation Act (2016).

References

External links

Owl Fact sheet
Threatened Birds

Australian masked owl
Birds of Australia
Birds of prey of New Guinea
Owls of Oceania
Australian masked owl